The Lord Howe Rise is a deep sea plateau which extends from south west of New Caledonia to the Challenger Plateau, west of New Zealand in the south west of the Pacific Ocean. To its west is the Tasman Basin and to the east is the New Caledonia Basin. It is part of Zealandia, a much larger continent that is now mostly submerged, and so is composed of continental crust.

Geology
The Lord Howe Rise is associated with seafloor spreading which also resulted in the creation of the Tasman Sea. The geology has not yet been characterised as well as other parts of Zealandia but when previous samples are analysed with current geological techniques they fit with the Zealandia hypothesis. Sandstone rocks dredged from the central Lord Howe Rise contained granite pebbles that were in the range 216–183 million years old. It was rifted away from Eastern Australia in association with a mid-ocean ridge that was active from 80 to 60 million years ago, and now lies 800 kilometres offshore from mainland Australia.

The Lord Howe Rise contains a line of seamounts called the Lord Howe Seamount Chain which formed during the Miocene period when this part of Zealandia existed over the Lord Howe hotspot. One rhyolite sample has been dated at 97 million years drilled on the southern Lord Howe Rise.  Lord Howe Island was the last volcano to erupt on the rise 6.5 million years ago.

Islands, reefs and seamounts
Lord Howe Island and Ball's Pyramid cap a seamount towards the central east of the rise in an area known as the Lord Howe platform.  The Lord Howe Seamount Chain extends northwards along the rise.  The seamounts provide habitat to a diverse range of marine species which attracts commercial fishers, but cover a very small area, less than 1% of the total area of Lord Howe Rise.

Further north is the Elizabeth and Middleton part of the Coral Sea Islands, which together with reefs around Lord Howe Island are the most southern coral reefs on Earth.

Environment
The seabed on the rise is mostly sandy mud with some volcanic outcrops, gravel and boulders.

The doubleheader fish, Coris bulbifrons, is endemic to reefs on the Lord Howe Rise and the West Norfolk Rise.

Resources
Much of the basin remains unexplored in relation to oil and gas reserves.

See also

References

Plateaus of Oceania
Underwater ridges of the Pacific Ocean
Zealandia
Tasman Sea